This is a list of mayors of Grand Rapids, Michigan. The current mayor is Rosalynn Bliss, who was sworn into office on January 1, 2016.

References

Grand Rapids, Michigan